Vaggeryd Municipality (Vaggeryds kommun) is a municipality in Jönköping County in southern Sweden. The town Skillingaryd is together with Vaggeryd the seat of the municipality. Most of the municipal administration is, however, placed in Skillingaryd.

The present municipality was created in 1971, when the two market towns Skillingaryd and Vaggeryd vere amalgamated with parts of the rural municipalities of Klevshult and Vrigstad.

A lot of the ground is boggy grounds and swamps which makes it important for different kinds of birds and other animals. It is easily accessible by car, guided tours are regularly conducted, and the total walking road adds up to 50 km.

In the area, iron has been processed since the Iron Age. It continued into the Middle Ages, and was very important for the inhabitants well into the 19th century.

In the municipality is also the horse track Vaggerydstravet located, with full rights for betting. A good supply of the natural resources: iron, wood and water, and good communications with larger cities around the province made Vaggeryd a centre for many industries of various kind. A chair manufacturer established itself in the small town of Hagsfors in the 1863, producing the Windsor chair that since has become a standard furniture in Sweden and soon found a market in England.

More wood and carpentry industry sprung out during the 19th century. Manufacturing of different travelling equipages was important, and transportations and communication with other parts of the province were important, and so the wheel came to symbolize the thinking of the municipality. It is manifested in the coat of arms.

Other industries related to the resources are paper manufacturing and pulp mills. While nowadays, tourism makes up an important part of its industry.

Recently, the "Vaggeryd model" has been thought up by some locals and has since been adapted by some 30 other municipalities of Sweden. Its purpose is to create bridges between industries.

Localities
There are 4 urban areas (also called a Tätort or locality) in Vaggeryd Municipality.

In the table the localities are listed according to the size of the population as of December 31, 2005. The municipal seat is in bold characters.

References 

Statistics Sweden

External links 

Vaggeryd - Official site
Coat of arms
The Vaggeryd Model paper (PDF file).

Municipalities of Jönköping County